William Yalden (1740 – January 1824) was an English cricketer and, with Tom Sueter, one of the earliest known wicket-keeper/batsmen. Yalden played mainly for Chertsey and Surrey though he was also a regular, sometimes as captain, in England teams, particularly in matches against Hampshire. His career began in the 1760s and he is known to have played until 1785.

Cricket career
Between 1772 and 1783, Yalden made 44 known appearances in matches now classified as first-class by ESPNcricinfo and CricketArchive. This is the total found in Scores & Biographies and cited by ESPNcricinfo; it is also the total that can be counted in CricketArchive's list of his matches but CricketArchive erroneously says he made 45 appearances. CricketArchive also lists seven "miscellaneous" matches in which Yalden is recorded, the last two of these in 1784 and 1785.

While fielding records are incomplete during Yalden's career, he is credited with 64 catches and one stumping in his first-class record. Stumpings are difficult to find in the eighteenth century sources because they were often recorded as run outs, though there is one scorecard in which a dismissal is recorded as "put out behind The Yold": i.e., st Yalden. Yalden's single first-class stumping was recorded in a Surrey v Hampshire match at Laleham Burway in October 1778, the victim being Henry Bonham. According to Scores & Biographies, this was the second-ever record of a stumping following one in 1744; though stumpings did occur, it was not written down as such in the score.

Yalden's best performance with the bat was probably in September 1773 when he played for a Surrey XI versus a Hampshire XI at Broadhalfpenny Down: he scored 88 out of 225 and enabled Surrey to win the game by an innings and 60 runs. This innings was the world record for the highest individual score in first-class matches since the statistical record began in 1772, breaking the inaugural record of 78 by John Small in the first match of the 1772 season. Yalden's score was beaten by Joseph Miller, who made 95 at Sevenoaks Vine in August 1774.

According to Arthur Haygarth, Yalden gave up cricket for one season because he thought his eyesight was failing, but the Earl of Tankerville said to him: "Try again, Yalden". So he resumed his career with continued success. The story may be apocryphal as Yalden certainly played continuously from 1772, though the incident could have occurred before then. Haygarth also reports that once, when fielding, Yalden had to jump over a fence and ended up on his back, but still caught the ball.

The Cricketers of My Time
In The Cricketers of My Time, Yalden was briefly mentioned in somewhat unfavourable terms by John Nyren whose comments may have had some substance but, on the other hand, it is difficult to believe that the Hambledon players were all as perfect as Nyren portrayed them to be. The Hampshire teams promoted by the Hambledon Club were very competitive and so, evidently, were their opponents, among whom Yalden was a prominent member, sometimes as captain. Nyren describes Yalden as "a thin, dark-looking man" and as "not a fine, but a very useful and steady batter". Nyren revered Hambledon's Tom Sueter and Yalden was Sueter's rival as both a wicketkeeper and a batsman, although they played together for Hampshire in 1772. They are the first two players in cricket history to be recognised as "wicketkeeper/batsmen", since they were specialist keepers who nevertheless justified selection for their batting alone. Nyren chose to denigrate Yalden in comparison with his hero Sueter saying that: "I must place Sueter above Yalden" (i.e., as a wicketkeeper) and that Yalden "was in other respects an inferior man to Sueter". Nyren says that Yalden's "word was not always to be depended on when he had put a man out" as "he would now and then shuffle (sic) and "resort to trick". He goes on to assert that Sueter and the other Hambledon players would not do such things because of "estimation", "honour", "trust" and never questioning the decision of the umpire. Nyren's comments are seriously biased but some balance is provided by the editor's introduction to the modern version of the book when he states that "Yalden – the England wicketkeeper and captain, no less – is dismissed in a few words" while several other notable players are not mentioned at all. Elsewhere the editor discusses Nyren's undoubted plagiarism of an earlier work by William Lambert and it is widely agreed that Nyren's account of Hambledon's players is hagiographic, often at the expense of their opponents, and Yalden is one player who was not given a fair hearing in this book.

Outside cricket
Yalden was a licensed victualler in Chertsey and, like Lumpy Stevens, was a long-time member of the local club. He managed the Laleham Burway ground situated close to the town, supplying refreshments during the great matches.

Footnotes

References

Sources

External links
 

1740 births
1824 deaths
English cricketers of 1701 to 1786
English cricketers
Hambledon cricketers
Hampshire cricketers
Kent cricketers
Surrey cricketers
Chertsey cricketers
Sportspeople from Chertsey
Wicket-keepers